War crime is a serious violation of the laws of war.

War crime or War crimes may also refer to:

War Crimes (film), 2005
War Crimes (The West Wing), season 3
"War Crimes", a song from Waterparks' 2019 album, Fandom
"World of Warcraft: War Crimes" a 2014 book by Christie Golden

See also 
List of war crimes